Hubertus Jozef Margaretha "Huub" Stevens (born 29 November 1953) is a Dutch former professional football manager and player.

Playing career
Stevens was born in Sittard. While active, he played for Fortuna Sittard and PSV. During his time at PSV, he won the Eredivisie three times, the KNVB Cup once and also won the UEFA Cup once, in 1978. He also earned 18 caps for the Netherlands national team, scoring one goal and appearing in the 1980 European Championship finals.

Managerial career
Soon after beginning his career as head of youth development at PSV, where he helped bring and develop players and managers such as Nick Theslof, in 1993, Stevens became the manager of Roda JC Kerkrade. From October 1996 to June 2002, he managed German Bundesliga side Schalke 04, with whom he won the UEFA Cup in 1997 and the DFB-Pokal in 2001 and 2002. In 1999, Schalke fans picked Stevens as manager of the century.

Afterwards, Stevens was appointed manager of Hertha BSC, but he was sacked on 4 December 2003. He was then hired by 1. FC Köln, which he managed from 14 June 2004 to 27 May 2005, when he signed a two-year contract with Roda JC. Under Stevens, 1. FC Köln became champions of the 2. Bundesliga and were promoted to the Bundesliga. Stevens was at Roda until he returned to the German Bundesliga, becoming the new manager of Hamburger SV on 2 February 2007. By the time Stevens took over, the club was in the relegation zone. Results improved quite dramatically and led to Hamburg avoiding relegation and even finishing seventh in the league, thereby qualifying for the 2007 UEFA Intertoto Cup.

Stevens took over the managing vacancy at PSV after his Hamburg contract expired at the end of the 2007–08 season. It was reported he signed a two-year contract with the Eindhoven club, a club he holds very dearly to his heart. However, on 28 January 2009, he resigned as manager, after which he signed a contract with Red Bull Salzburg in the Austrian Bundesliga on 22 April 2009.

On 9 February 2010, Stevens extended his contract with Red Bull Salzburg until 2012, but he was sacked on 8 April 2011. On 27 September 2011, he returned to Schalke 04 and signed a contract lasting until 2013, following Ralf Rangnick's resignation. On 16 December 2012, Stevens was sacked by Schalke.

On 25 June 2013, Stevens became manager of Superleague Greece side PAOK. PAOK terminated his contract on 2 March 2014 due to the club's poor results.

After his departure, Stevens was appointed manager of VfB Stuttgart on 9 March 2014, replacing Thomas Schneider. Stevens started his new position with training on 10 March 2014. His first match in charge was against Werder Bremen, a 1–1 draw. He resigned as manager of Stuttgart on 10 May 2014 following a 1–0 loss to Bayern Munich. He finished his stint with a record of three wins, three draws and four losses in ten matches.

On 25 November 2014, Stevens returned to VfB Stuttgart. His first match in his return to the club was a 4–1 win against SC Freiburg on 28 November 2014. On 21 March 2015, in a 3–1 win against Eintracht Frankfurt, Stuttgart won its first match of 2015 and its second home win of the 2014–15 season. He left Stuttgart at the end of the 2014–15 season, where Stuttgart finished in the 14th position in the Bundesliga.

Stevens was appointed manager of 1899 Hoffenheim on 26 October 2015 after the club started the season with just six points in ten matches. He resigned on 10 February 2016, citing health problems.

On 14 March 2019, he returned to Schalke as an interim until the end of the season after Domenico Tedesco was sacked by the club.

On 18 December 2020, he returned to Schalke once again as an interim. This time he coached the club for only two matches. Schalke could not end a winless streak of 28 games in the Bundesliga in his first match, losing 0–1 to Arminia Bielefeld, but won the next match 3–1 against SSV Ulm in the DFB-Pokal.

Managerial statistics

Honours

Player
PSV
Eredivisie: 1975–76, 1977–78, 1985–86
KNVB Cup: 1975–76 
UEFA Cup: 1977–78

Manager

Roda JC
Eredivisie runner-up: 1994–95

Schalke 04
UEFA Cup: 1996–97
DFB-Pokal: 2000–01, 2001–02
Bundesliga runner-up: 2000–01

Hertha BSC
DFB-Ligapokal: 2002

1. FC Köln
2. Bundesliga: 2004–05

Hamburger SV
UEFA Intertoto Cup: 2007

PSV
Johan Cruyff Shield: 2008

Red Bull Salzburg
Austrian Bundesliga: 2009–10

See also
List of UEFA Cup winning managers

References

External links

Living people
1953 births
People from Sittard
Dutch footballers
Association football defenders
Eerste Divisie players
Eredivisie players
Netherlands international footballers
UEFA Euro 1980 players
Fortuna Sittard players
PSV Eindhoven players
Dutch association football commentators
Dutch football managers
Dutch expatriate football managers
Dutch expatriate sportspeople in Austria
Dutch expatriate sportspeople in Germany
Dutch expatriate sportspeople in Greece
Expatriate football managers in Austria
Expatriate football managers in Germany
Expatriate football managers in Greece
Eredivisie managers
Bundesliga managers
Super League Greece managers
UEFA Cup winning managers
Roda JC Kerkrade managers
FC Schalke 04 managers
Hamburger SV managers
1. FC Köln managers
Hertha BSC managers
FC Red Bull Salzburg managers
PAOK FC managers
VfB Stuttgart managers
TSG 1899 Hoffenheim managers
PSV Eindhoven managers
UEFA Cup winning players
FC Schalke 04 non-playing staff
Footballers from Limburg (Netherlands)
PSV Eindhoven non-playing staff